CTCC may refer to:

Sports
 China Touring Car Championship, a touring car racing series based in China
 CTCC - Canadian Touring Car Championship, a touring car racing series based in Canada

Institutes 
 Centre for Theoretical and Computational Chemistry, founded by the Norwegian Research Council in 2007